The United States Food Administration (1917–1920) was an independent Federal agency that controlled the production, distribution and conservation of food in the U.S. during the nation's participation in World War I. It was established to prevent monopolies and hoarding, and to maintain government control of foods through voluntary agreements and licensing. Herbert Hoover was appointed to serve as Food Administrator.

One of the agency's important tasks was the stabilization of the price of wheat on the U.S. market. Concepts such as "meatless Mondays" and "wheatless Wednesdays" were also implemented to help ration food, so that the government could prioritize the war effort.

Branches of the United States Food Administration were set up in all states as well as Alaska, Hawaii, Puerto Rico and Washington, D.C. The agency had broad powers but few mechanisms for enforcement of its policies. It relied largely upon patriotic appeals and voluntary compliance in the formal absence of rationing.

History

The appointment of Hoover
Woodrow Wilson realised he would need a dynamic leader to ensure the Food administration was effective. His advisor Edward House suggested Herbert Hoover, who had previously run the Commission for Relief in Belgium. Walter Hines Page, the British ambassador, endorsed this choice and Wilson, a Democrat, agreed although Hoover was a Republican. Hoover accepted the position only on the basis that he would have a completely free hand as regards the Washington bureaucracy, which in particular referred to David F. Houston, the Secretary of Agriculture. Despite initial resistance Houston acquiesced and Hoover was appointed.

Grain Corporation
The administration employed its Grain Corporation, organized under the provisions of the Food Control Act of August 10, 1917, as an agency for the purchase and sale of foodstuffs. Having done transactions in the size of $7 billion, the United States Food Administration was rendered obsolete by the armistice in Europe. President Woodrow Wilson promoted its transition in a new agency for the support of the reconstruction of Europe. It became the American Relief Administration, approved by an Act (Public, No. 274, 65th Congress) on February 25, 1919.

Poster gallery

See also 
 Clean Plate Club

References

Further reading
 Frank M. Surface / Raymond L. Bland: American Food in the World War and Reconstruction Period. Operations of the Organizations Under the Direction of Herbert Hoover 1914 to 1924, Stanford, CA: Stanford University Press, 1931

External links

 Wilson orders Hoover to start, The New York Times, June 17, 1917, p. 1
 Watson S. Moore, How wheat was saved to feed allied folk, The New York Times, January 5, 1919, p. 80
 Sow the Seeds of Victory! Posters from the Food Administration During World War I
 Saving Food, Saving Lives: World War 1 Food Posters
 The Wisconsin Food Administration responds to national food shortages in 1918, Wisconsin Historical Society
 
 
 

United States in World War I
United States home front during World War I
Defunct agencies of the United States government
Presidency of Woodrow Wilson